Spilarctia styx is a moth in the family Erebidae. It was described by George Thomas Bethune-Baker in 1910. It is found in Papua, Indonesia.

Subspecies
Spilarctia styx styx
Spilarctia styx albistriga (Talbot, 1929)

References

Moths described in 1910
styx